Chamo may refer to:
 Han'gŭl letters
 Mauricio Sanchez, the Venezuelan actor
 Lake Chamo, Ethiopia